Nasala was an Ancient city and bishopric in Roman Mesopotamia and remains a Latin Catholic titular see.

Its present location in Asian Turkey is unclear.

History 
Nasala was important enough in the Late Roman province of Mesopotamia Secunda to become a suffragan of its Metropolitan Archbishopric (Dara(s), replaced in the 19th century by Rhesaina), but would fade.

Titular see 
It was nominally restored in 1933 as a Latin Catholic titular bishopric, but remains without incumbent.

Source and External link 
 GCatholic

Catholic titular sees in Asia